The first signs of the modern distinction between criminal and civil proceedings were during the Norman conquest of England in 1066. The earliest criminal trials had very little, if any, settled law to apply. However, the civil delictual law was highly developed and consistent in its operation (except where the King wanted to raise money by selling a new form of Writ).

A local lord of the manor (or family) could hold their servants and tenants responsible in a manorial court and was among wealthy people who could more easily enlist the help of a county or city bailiff, posse comitatus if one existed and the justices of the peace. The sheriff was the often-armed representative of the king in a city, town or shire, responsible for collecting taxes and enforcing his laws. The church could hold ecclesiastical courts to resolve offences in its canon law and on its narrow territorial jurisdiction. 

Justice for crimes sought in older forums and by private prosecution declined—instead the state courts, and increasingly the state paying lawyers to prosecute became the normal route to justice for matters that conceivably affect or endanger the community at large. In the 18th century European countries began operating police forces; in 1829 the first force formed in England which began its own prosecutions. Consequently criminal law had a more harmonised way of enforcement.

Crown Prosecution

Historically in England, with no police forces and no prosecution service, the only route to prosecution was through private prosecutions brought by victims at their own expense or lawyers acting on their behalf. From 1829, as the police forces were formed, they began to take on the burden of bringing prosecutions against suspected criminals.

Sir John Maule was appointed to be the first Director of Public Prosecutions for England and Wales in 1880, operating under the Home Office; his jurisdiction was only for decisions as to whether to prosecute in a very small number of difficult or important cases; once prosecution had been authorised, the matter was turned over to the Treasury Solicitor. Police forces continued to be responsible for the bulk of cases, sometimes referring difficult ones to the Director.

In 1962 a Royal Commission recommended that police forces set up independent prosecution departments so as to avoid having the same officers investigate and prosecute cases, although technically the prosecuting police officers did so as private citizens. The Royal Commission's recommendation was not implemented by all police forces, however, and so in 1978, another Royal Commission was set up, this time headed by Sir Cyril Philips. It reported in 1981, recommending that a single unified Crown Prosecution Service with responsibility for all public prosecutions in England and Wales be set up. A White Paper was released in 1983, becoming the Prosecution of Offences Act 1985, which established the CPS under the direction of the Director of Public Prosecutions, consisting of a merger of his old department with the existing police prosecution departments. It began in 1986.

Common law offences

Abolished offences
The following common law offences once existed, but in England and Wales are now statutory (codified), part of other statutory offences, or completely abolished.
 Petty treason
 Arson
 Larceny
 Robbery
 Burglary
 Concealment of treasure trove
 Cheating, except in relation to the public revenue
 Forgery
 Sedition
 Seditious libel
 Misprision of felony (disputed - alleged never to have existed)
 Compounding a felony
 Riot
 Rout
 Unlawful assembly
 Affray
 Defamatory libel (aka criminal libel, aka criminal defamatory libel)
 Obscene libel
 Blasphemy
 Blasphemous libel
 Incitement
 Maintenance (not including embracery)
 Champerty
 Bribery
 Embracery
 Challenging to fight
 Eavesdropping
 Being a common barrator – see Barratry
 Being a common scold
 Being a common nightwalker
 Forcible entry
 Forcible detainer (occupying property belonging to another with "menaces, force and arms" and without lawful authority)
Attempt
 Conspiracy (except for conspiracy to defraud, conspiracy to corrupt public morals and conspiracy to outrage public decency)

See also criminal libel for general information about the common law libel offences listed above.

Offences held no longer to exist or never to have existed
 Effecting a public mischief
 Conspiracy to effect a public mischief

Offences against the person

Fatal offences

Extant offences
 Murder
 Manslaughter

Abolished offences
 Petty treason
 Capital murder
 Felo de se

Sexual offences

Extant offences
 Rape

Abolished offences
 Buggery
 Assault with intent to commit buggery
 Gross indecency between men
 Indecent assault on a man
 Indecent assault on a woman

Non-fatal non-sexual offences
 Common assault

Offences against property

Extant offences
 Criminal damage in English law#History

Abolished offences
 Larceny
 Embezzlement
 Fraudulent conversion

Firearms and offensive weapons

Forgery, personation and cheating

Abolished offences
See forgery:
 Offences under section 18 and section 20 of the Pharmacy Act 1954 repealed by The Pharmacists and Pharmacy Technicians Order 2007

See personation:
 Offences under section 13 of the Customs and Excise Management Act 1979
 Offences under section 12 of the Inland Revenue Regulation Act 1890

(Both repealed by the Commissioners for Revenue and Customs Act 2005)

See cheating:

Offences against the State or Crown or Government and political offences

Abolished offences
 Sedition
 Seditious libel
 Incitement to mutiny, contrary to section 1 of the Incitement to Mutiny Act 1797
 Offences under the Unlawful Drilling Act 1819
 Various forms of statutory piracy

Harmful or dangerous drugs

Offences against religion and public worship

Abolished offences
 Blasphemy
 Blasphemous libel

Offences against the administration of public justice

Abolished offences
 Misprision of felony
 Compounding a felony
 Embracery

Offences held no longer to exist or never to have existed
 In 1954, the judgment of the Queen's Bench in the case of R v Newland contraindicated the offence of effecting a public mischief, whereas in Shaw v DPP (1960), the House of Lords ruled that indeed it had existed and continued to exist.
 Conspiracy to effect a public mischief

Public order offences

Abolished offences
 Rout
 Unlawful assembly
 Breach of the peace
 Defamatory libel

Offences against public morals and public policy

Abolished offences
Obscene libel
Offences under the Prevention of Corruption Acts 1889 to 1916
The common law offence of bribery

Protection of children and vulnerable adults

Protection of animals and the environment

Road traffic and motor vehicle offences

Participatory offences

Abolished offences
 Incitement
 Accessory to felony: Secondary principal/Principal in the second degree, Accessory before the fact, Accessory after the fact

Classification of offences

Abolished classes
 Felony
 Misdemeanour
 Arrestable offence

Defences

Abolished defences
 Provocation

Procedure

Abolished proceedings
 Criminal information

See also
 Criminal law

References

 Hale, Matthew. Historia Placitorum Coronæ (History of the Pleas of the Crown) (1736).
 Stephen, Sir James Fitzjames. History of the Criminal Law of England (1883).
Radzinowicz, Sir Leon. A History of English Criminal Law and Its Administration from 1750. 5 volumes. 1948 to 1990.
John Hostettler. A History of Criminal Justice in England and Wales. Waterside Press. 2009. Google Books
John Hamilton Baker. An Introduction to English Legal History. Third Edition. Butterworths. 1990. Chapters 28 and 29.
John Hamilton Baker, "Pleas of the Crown" (1978) 94 Selden Society annual volumes 299
J M Kaye et al. "The Making of English Criminal Law" (1977 to 1978) Criminal Law Review
John G Bellamy. Criminal Law and Society in Late Medieval and Tudor England. Alan Sutton. 1984. Google Books
Edward Powell. Kingship, Law, and Society: Criminal Justice in the Reign of Henry V. Clarendon Press. Oxford. 1989. Google Books
John H Langbein. Prosecuting Crime in the Renaissance: England, Germany France. Harvard University Press. 1974. Google Books. Lawbook Exchange. Clark, New Jersey. 2005. Google Books
J S Cockburn (ed). Crime in England 1550–1800. Meuthen. 1977. Google Books
J. M. Beattie. Crime and the Courts in England 1660–1800. OUP. 1986. Google Books
David Bentley. English Criminal Justice in the 19th Century. Hambledon Press. 1998. Google Books
John G Bellamy. The Criminal Trial in Later Medieval England. University of Toronto Press. 1998. Google Books

English criminal law
Criminal law
English criminal law